The women's 400 metre individual medley event at the 2004 Olympic Games was contested at the Olympic Aquatic Centre of the Athens Olympic Sports Complex in Athens, Greece on August 14.

World record holder Yana Klochkova of Ukraine successfully defended her Olympic title in this event, outside the record time of 4:34.83. U.S. swimmer Kaitlin Sandeno, who finished behind Klochkova by 0.12 of a second, earned a silver medal, in an American record time of 4:34.95. Georgina Bardach, on the other hand, won Argentina's first Olympic bronze medal in swimming, breaking a South American record of 4:37.51. South Korea's Nam Yoo-sun and Greece's Vasiliki Angelopoulou became the first female swimmers for their respective nation to reach an Olympic final, finishing outside the medals in seventh and eighth place, respectively. Romania's Beatrice Câșlaru, who won a bronze medal in Sydney, finished only in fourteenth place on the morning's preliminary heats.

Records
Prior to this competition, the existing world and Olympic records were as follows.

Results

Heats

Final

References

External links
Official Olympic Report

W
2004 in women's swimming
Women's events at the 2004 Summer Olympics